General James Balfour (3 November 1743 – 18 March 1823) was a son of Robert Balfour of Balbirnie and Ann Ramsay.

Balfour entered the British army 22 March 1762. He was commanding the forces at Bombay in 1794. He became colonel of the 83rd Regiment on 18 November 1795 and took part in the Siege of Seringapatam. On 25 October 1809 received the rank of general.

On 20 March 1823, following the death of James Balfour, John Hodgson succeeded to the colonelcy of the 83rd Regiment.

References

1743 births
1823 deaths
British Army generals
83rd (County of Dublin) Regiment of Foot officers
James
British military personnel of the Third Anglo-Mysore War